Instinto is a Spanish erotic thriller television series starring Mario Casas. Created by Teresa Fernández-Valdés, Ramón Campos and Gema R. Neira and produced by Bambú Producciones for Movistar+, it was released on 10 May 2019.

Premise 
Marco Mur (Mario Casas) is a successful businessman, the CEO of ALVA, a tech company about to launch an innovative prototype of electric car, in which he works together with his friend Diego (Jon Arias) and Bárbara (Bruna Cusí). A newcomer, the ambitious Eva (Silvia Alonso), joins the company. Marco is however introverted and emotionally blocked. Dependent on his psychologist Sara (Miryam Gallego), Marco's only mental escape routes are sport and a private club where members receive sexual pleasure and give free rein to their erotic fantasies.

Marco has an autistic younger brother, José (Óscar Casas), interned in a specialized center where the only person able to connect with him is Carol (Ingrid García-Jonsson).

Cast 
 Mario Casas as Marco Mur.
 Ingrid García-Jonsson as Carol Majó, José's therapist.
 Silvia Alonso as Eva Vergara, an ambitious engineer and newcomer to Alva.
 Miryam Gallego as Sara Ortuño, a psychologist treating Marco.
 Jon Arias as Diego Bernal, Marco's friend and business partner.
 Bruna Cusí as Bárbara Robles, Diego's wife and Alva's marketing director.
 Óscar Casas as José Mur, Marco's autistic brother.
 Elvira Mínguez as Doctora Villegas, the director of the centre José is interned in.
 Lola Dueñas as Laura, Marco and José's mother.
 Juan Diego Botto as Pol Garrido, a peculiar psychologist.

Production and release 

The series was shot in 2018. A former weapons factory in Guadalajara was repurposed as the premises of ALVA, the lead character's company. The  in Madrid was used to recreate the club. , in the Sierra de Guadarrama, was another shooting location.

The series, consisting of 8 episodes with a running time of about 50 min, was released on Movistar+ on 10 May 2019. The supporting performance of Óscar Casas (rather than his older brother's leading performance) received praise in social media.

Awards and nominations 

|-
| align = "center" | 2020 || 7h Feroz Awards || Best Supporting Actor in a TV Series || Óscar Casas  ||  || align = "center" | 
|}

References 
Informational notes

Citations

Erotic thrillers
Spanish thriller television series
Television shows filmed in Spain
2019 Spanish television series debuts
2019 Spanish television series endings
Movistar+ original programming
Spanish-language television shows
2010s Spanish drama television series
Television series by Bambú Producciones